Scars is a Canadian short documentary film, directed by Alex Anna and released in 2020. Blending live action with animation, the film explores Anna's own mental health history by documenting the scars resulting from her own history of self-harm.

The film premiered at the 2020 Toronto International Film Festival.

The film was named to TIFF's year-end Canada's Top Ten list for short films.

References

External links
 

2020 films
2020 short documentary films
Canadian short documentary films
French-language Canadian films
2020s Canadian films